Charles G. "Chuck" Dow Sr. (August 15, 1931 – May 8, 2015) was an American businessman and politician.

Born in Gardiner, Maine, Dow graduated from Gardiner High School and Gates Business College. He served in the United States Air Force during the Korean War. Dow owned an insurance agency. Dow served in the Maine House of Representatives from 1971 to 1980 and the Maine State Senate from 1983 to 1990 and was a Democrat. He died in Augusta, Maine from cancer.

Notes

1931 births
2015 deaths
People from Gardiner, Maine
Businesspeople from Maine
Military personnel from Maine
Democratic Party members of the Maine House of Representatives
Democratic Party Maine state senators
Deaths from cancer in Maine
20th-century American businesspeople
United States Air Force personnel of the Korean War